It's Up to You may refer to:

 It's Up to You (film), a 1936 crime drama film directed by Christy Cabanne
 "It's Up to You" (Ricky Nelson song), 1962
 It's Up to You (Al Dexter song), 1946
 It's Up to You (The Tuesdays song), 1998
 "It's Up to You!", a 2001 song by The Brilliant Green from the album Los Angeles
 It's Up to You (album), a 1993 album by Girlfriend
 "It's Up to You", a song by Cheap Trick from the 1986 album The Doctor
 "It's Up to You", a song by John Denver from his 1974 album Back Home Again